The Unseen is a 1945 American film noir mystery film directed by Lewis Allen and starring Joel McCrea. It's based on the 1942 novel Midnight House (US title: Her Heart in Her Throat) by Ethel Lina White.

The film was Paramount's follow-up vehicle to The Uninvited (1944), in which star Gail Russell surged to popularity.

Raymond Chandler was one of the writers of the script.

Plot

An old homeless woman is murdered after seeing a light through the basement window of abandoned 11 Crescent Drive. Young Barney Fielding witnesses this from his window next door at number 10.

Elizabeth Howard (Gail Russell), arrives at the house to be governess to Barney and his sister, Ellen, but is met with aggression from the boy who is unusually attached to their former governess, Maxine, and tells her: "You're my enemy! I hate you!"  Elizabeth's room overlooks the garden of the eerie house next door, and she finds a watch that belonged to the murdered old woman in her dressing table.

Over the next few weeks, Marian Tygarth (Isobel Elsom), a widow who owns shuttered-up 11 Crescent Drive, returns to put the house up for sale. Elizabeth suspects someone is gaining access to the cellars and confides in David Fielding (Joel McCrea), the children's father, but he dismisses her concerns. She turns to Dr. Evans (Herbert Marshall), a neighbor and friend of the family, who advises her not to call the police as David shouldn't like it (unknown to Ellen, David was once suspected of murdering his wife).  Ellen tells Elizabeth that Barney is the one who lets the lurking man into the house at night, on Maxine's orders. The next day, the employment agency tells Elizabeth they cannot send anyone over that day.  However, a new maid arrives at the house, and Elizabeth eventually realizes she is Maxine (Phyllis Brooks); David tries to throw Maxine out of the house. Shortly after, she is found murdered outside the empty house.  David is nowhere to be found, which causes the police to consider him the prime suspect. After the police leave, Mrs. Tygarth comes over to keep Elizabeth company after the children have gone to bed.

Mrs. Tygarth tells Ellen that the man who murdered her husband is next door as they speak. She says that she is being forced to help the mysterious man, who has been visiting there every night, to clean the bloody crime scene from 12 years before.  She knows she is his next victim and tells Elizabeth she is going to call the police, but actually goes next door to kill the still unknown man; he kills her instead. Elizabeth still suspects the perpetrator might be David, and calls on Dr. Evans for help.  David arrives and accuses Dr. Evans, who is revealed to be the killer, which he became when he once thought that he could have Mrs. Tygarth for himself.

Cast
 Joel McCrea as David Fielding
 Gail Russell as Elizabeth Howard
 Herbert Marshall as Dr. Charles Evans
 Phyllis Brooks as Maxine
 Isobel Elsom as Marian Tygarth
 Norman Lloyd as Jasper Goodwin
 Mikhail Rasumny as Chester
 Elisabeth Risdon as Mrs. Norris
 Tom Tully as Sullivan
 Nona Griffith as Ellen Fielding
 Richard Lyon as Barnaby Fielding

Awards and nominations
The Unseen was nominated for Best Sound Recording at the 1946 Oscars.

References

External links

 
 
 

1945 films
American mystery films
American black-and-white films
Film noir
Films scored by Ernst Toch
Films based on British novels
Films directed by Lewis Allen
1940s ghost films
American haunted house films
Paramount Pictures films
1940s romantic fantasy films
Films with screenplays by Raymond Chandler
Films set in New England
1945 horror films
1945 mystery films
American romantic fantasy films
1940s English-language films
1940s American films